Pleasanton is an unincorporated community in Athens County, Ohio, United States.

History
The first house in Pleasanton was built in 1817, and other settlement soon followed. A post office called Pleasanton was established in 1850, and remained in operation until 1906.

References

Populated places in Athens County, Ohio
1817 establishments in Ohio
Populated places established in 1817